Events from the year 1956 in art.

Events
March 1 – Replica statue of the Discus Thrower dedicated in Washington, D.C., as a gift from the Italian government to commemorate the return of looted art objects after World War II.
March – 56 Group founded, to promote modernist art in Wales. Subsequently renamed 56 Group Wales.
September 17 – Release in the United States of the biographical film Lust for Life with Kirk Douglas portraying Vincent van Gogh and Anthony Quinn as Paul Gauguin.
Le mystère Picasso, a French documentary film, shows Pablo Picasso in the act of creating paintings for the camera (which he subsequently destroys so that they will exist only on film).
William Klein publishes his photo essay New York, 1954–55.
Shanghai Art Museum, the predecessor of the China Art Museum, opens.
English curator Jim Ede settles at Kettle's Yard, Cambridge, England.
English painter Edward Seago joins a tour of the Antarctic.
Two attacks are made on Leonardo da Vinci's Mona Lisa in the Louvre, Paris.

Awards
Archibald Prize: William Dargie – Mr Albert Namatjira
Kate Greenaway Medal – Edward Ardizzone for Tim All Alone

Films
Lust for Life

Works

Laurence Bradshaw – Monument to Karl Marx at Highgate Cemetery, London (including bronze bust)
Alexander Calder – Red Mobile
Frank Cadogan Cowper – The Golden Bowl
Salvador Dalí – Living Still Life
M. C. Escher – Print Gallery (lithograph)
Max Ernst – L’oiseau Rose
Helen Frankenthaler – Eden
Richard Hamilton – Just What Is It that Makes Today's Homes So Different, So Appealing? (collage)
Rudolf Hausner – The Ark of Odysseus
Eduardo Kingman – La Lavendera
Roy Lichtenstein – Ten Dollar Bill (lithograph)
O. Winston Link - Hotshot Eastbound (black-and-white photograph)
L. S. Lowry – The Floating Bridge
Joan Mitchell 
Café
Hemlock
Candido Portinari – Self-portrait
Norman Rockwell – The Scoutmaster
Kay Sage – Le Passage
Alexander Nikolayevich Samokhvalov – Cafe Gurzuf
Charles Sheeler – On a Shaker Theme
David Wynne – Sir Thomas Beecham (bronzes)

Exhibitions
August 9–September 9 – This Is Tomorrow, Whitechapel Art Gallery, London, featuring principally the interdisciplinary ICA Independent Group, including early examples of Pop Art.

Births
January 2 – Lynda Barry, American cartoonist 
January 19 – Junpei Satoh, Japanese Western-style painter
February 24 – Fiona Graham-Mackay, née Bain, British portrait painter
May 25 – Andrea Pazienza, Italian comics artist (d. 1988)
date unknown
Emma Biggs, English mosaicist
Cornelia Parker, English sculptor and installation artist
Veronica Ryan, Montserrat-born British sculptor
Mackenzie Thorpe, English painter and sculptor

Deaths
January 13 – Lyonel Feininger, German American painter and cartoonist (b. 1871)
April 23 – Cecile Walton, Scottish painter, illustrator and sculptor (b. 1891)
May 3 – Peter Watson, English arts benefactor (murdered) (b. 1908)
June 8 – Marie Laurencin, French painter and engraver (b. 1883)
June 11 - Frank Brangwyn, Welsh painter (b. 1867)
July 26 – Louis Raemaekers, Dutch painter and cartoonist (b. 1869)
August 7 – LeMoine FitzGerald, Canadian painter (b. 1890)
August 11 – Jackson Pollock, American painter (b. 1912)
August 16 – Theodor Pallady, Romanian painter (b. 1871)
November 3 – Jean Metzinger, French painter (b. 1883)
December 16 – Nina Hamnett, British painter, model and designer (b. 1890)
Mohamed Nagy, Egyptian painter (b. 1888)

See also
 1956 in Fine Arts of the Soviet Union

References

 
Years of the 20th century in art
1950s in art